Enrico Butti (April 3, 1847 – January 21, 1932) was an Italian sculptor, active mainly in Milan. He created principally funerary and commemorative monuments. He was professor of sculpture at the Accademia di Brera from 1893 to 1913.

Biography

He was born to a family of marble cutters and sculptors. At the age of 14, he began studying at the Brera under the sculptor Pietro Magni, making ends meet by working for other sculptors such as Francesco Barzaghi, Ugo Zannoni, and Magni. In the 1872 National Exhibition in Milan, he exhibited his first work, a marble Raphael, but two years later his Eleonora d'Este drew much praise. In 1879, he exhibited at the Brera a monument for the Cavi-Bossi family, for which he gained the Prince Umberto prize. In subsequent exhibition, he completed the work Time for the monument of the Borghi family, the monument for the Guerrini family, and the monument for the Galbiati family, depicting the symbols of brotherhood. These monuments are now in the Monumental Cemetery of Milan. His Il Minatore ("the miner") was exhibited at the Brera; it is now in a Düsseldorf cemetery.

Other sculptures include Tasso in Jail (now in St Petersburg); Cain; Le smorfie; Stizze; St Jerome (1875); Il mio garzone; Santa Rosa da Lima for the Duomo of Milan (1876); I minatori del Sempione (1906) ; and the sculptural group of La tregua (1906). Also for the cemetery of Milan, he sculpted a Mater consolatrix and the complex monument to the Besenzanica family (1912). He made a monument for the fallen set up in  Viggiù in 1919, another for Gallarate (set up in 1924) in Piazza Risorgimento, and finally one in Varese (1925).

 Also he was the author of the memorial to the founder of the Saint-Petersburg circus - Gaetano Ciniselli (1815-1881), who died in Russia.

Among his public monuments are statues of Generale Sirtori in the public gardens of Milan. And the statue of the Unity of Italy for the Vittoriano in Rome. He sculpted La morente in 1891 for a funeral chapel of the Casati family.

In 1913, due to worsening pulmonary problems he moved back to Viggiù, where he continued to work till his death. He was also a painter.

References 

1847 births
1932 deaths
20th-century Italian sculptors
20th-century Italian male artists
19th-century Italian sculptors
Italian male sculptors
Academic staff of Brera Academy
Brera Academy alumni
19th-century Italian male artists
People from Viggiù